Mandurang, is a  locality in the City of Greater Bendigo, in the Australian state of Victoria. It grew and developed as a goldfield settlement and logging locality, though today mostly consists of small farms and wineries. Mandurang Primary School was opened in 1877 and closed in 1994. The name is derived from an Aboriginal word meaning black cicada.

References

Towns in Victoria (Australia)
Bendigo
Suburbs of Bendigo